Justine Fedronic (born 11 May 1991) is a French middle-distance runner. She competed in the 800 metres at the 2014 and 2016 European Athletics Championships.

Professional
Fedronic represented France at Athletics at the 2016 Summer Olympics – Women's 800 metres and placed 46th in 2:02.73.

NCAA
Fedronic held a Stanford University school record for the outdoor 800 meters at 2 minutes, 00.97 seconds and is a two-time NCAA Division I All-American are secondary to the experience of being a part of a team. At the 2014 NCAA Division I Indoor Track and Field Championships, she placed 2nd with Amy Weissenbach, Kristyn Williams, Claudia Saunders, Justine Fedronic in Distance medley relay. At the 2013 NCAA Division I Outdoor Track and Field Championships, she placed 3rd in 800 m. At the 2012 NCAA Women's Division I Indoor Track and Field Championships and NCAA Women's Division I Outdoor Track and Field Championships, she earned honorable All-American by her 9th place finishes.

Prep
Federonic graduated from Carlmont High School. Fedronic qualified for California Interscholastic Federation state track and field championship in 2006, 2008 and 2009. She won the 800 m in 2:12.81 at the 2009 CIF Central Coast Section Track Championships and won the 3 miles in 18:15.0 at the 2008 CIF-Central Coast Section Cross Country Championships. Fedronic won both 2006 and 2007 CIF-Central Coast Section Cross Country Championships. Fedronic won 800 meters at 2007 Arcadia Invitational in 2:08.08 and returned as a senior to the high school invitational to win the 800 m in 2:09.27.

References

External links

Stanford Cardinal results

1991 births
Living people
French female middle-distance runners
Place of birth missing (living people)
Athletes (track and field) at the 2016 Summer Olympics
Olympic athletes of France
21st-century French women